The Australian Koala Foundation (AKF) is registered Australian charity created in 1986, dedicated to the effective management and conservation of the koala and its habitat. It is the principal non-profit, non-governmental organisation dedicated to the conservation and effective management of the wild koala and its habitat.

The AKF lobbies the federal and state governments on issues it sees as pertinent to the conservation of koalas, including around the Sunshine Coast, and central Queensland.

In 2020 the AFK claimed the federal government was wasting time and resources on research at the expense of habitat conservation.

In 2016 and 2019 the AFK declared that koalas were ‘functionally extinct’, but those claims were subsequently challenged as untrue. The claim in May 2019 by the AKF that Australia's koala population was as low as 80,000 animals was challenged by reports that the true population could be more than 300,000.

In 2019 the AKF expressed grave concerns over the Environment Protection and Biodiversity Conservation Act 1999, claiming it did not go far enough to protect koalas.

The 2019–20 Australian bushfire season had a devastating impact on koala habitat and populations. Chairman of the AKF, Deborah Tabart, estimated that over 1,000 koalas were killed and that 80 percent of their habitat has been destroyed.

The AFK has lobbied for a specific federal koala protection act, akin to the United States’ Bald Eagle Endangered Species Act, which has protected its fauna emblem, the bald eagle, since 1973.

The AKF created the 'Save the Koala month', held annually each September, to raise funds for its work.

The AFK has been subject to severe criticism from other koala conservationists for not doing enough to protect koalas.

See also

 Conservation in Australia

References

Animal conservation organizations
Nature conservation organisations based in Australia
Foundation
Environmental organizations established in 1986
Scientific organizations established in 1986
1986 establishments in Australia